Shakirullah is an Afghan cricketer. He made his first-class debut for Band-e-Amir Region in the 2017–18 Ahmad Shah Abdali 4-day Tournament on 20 October 2017.

References

External links
 

Year of birth missing (living people)
Living people
Afghan cricketers
Band-e-Amir Dragons cricketers
Place of birth missing (living people)